Stefan Hugo 'Kabous' van Schalkwyk (born ) is a South African rugby union player who last played for the  in the Currie Cup and the  in the Rugby Challenge. His regular position is prop.

References

South African rugby union players
Living people
1994 births
People from George, South Africa
Rugby union props
Free State Cheetahs players
Rugby union players from the Western Cape